The Colt Python is a .357 Magnum caliber revolver manufactured by Colt's Manufacturing Company of Hartford, Connecticut. It was first introduced in 1955, the same year as Smith & Wesson's M29 .44 Magnum. The Colt Python is intended for the premium revolver market segment. Some firearm collectors and writers such as Jeff Cooper, Ian V. Hogg, Chuck Hawks, Leroy Thompson, Scott Wolber, Renee Smeets and Martin Dougherty have described the Python as "the finest production revolver ever made".

The reintroduced Python has been technically revised and reinforced compared to the original revolver.

Description
The Colt Python is a double action handgun chambered for the .357 Magnum cartridge, built on Colt's large I-frame. Pythons have a reputation for accuracy, smooth trigger pull, and a tight cylinder lock-up. They are similar in size and function to the Colt Trooper and Colt Lawman revolvers.

History
The Colt Python was first introduced in 1955 as Colt's top-of-the-line model and was originally intended to be a large-frame .38 Special target revolver. As a result, it features precision adjustable sights, a smooth trigger, solid construction, and extra metal. Pythons have a distinct appearance due to a full barrel underlug, ventilated rib and adjustable sights. Colt originally manufactured Pythons with hollow underlugs but left them solid to work as a stabilizing barrel weight. When the revolver is at full cock, just as the trigger is pressed, the cylinder locks up for the duration of the hammer strike. Other revolvers have a hint of looseness even at full-cock. The gap between the cylinder and forcing cone is very tight, further aiding accuracy and velocity. From the 1970s each Python revolver was boresighted at the factory with a laser; the first mass-produced revolver for which this was done.

End of production
In October 1999, Colt announced that it would cease production of Python revolvers. In a 2000 follow-up letter to distributors, the company cited changing market conditions and the costs of defending lawsuits as the reasons to discontinue the Python line, as well as a number of other models. The Colt Custom Gun Shop continued making a limited number of Pythons on special order until 2005, when this limited production ceased.

Production return

The Colt Python was officially re-released by Colt in January 2020, following months of circulating rumors. All new production Pythons are shipped with Altamont wood grips.

Models and variants

The original Python was initially available in carbon steel with two finishes, a deep blue, designated as Royal Blue; and a standard high polish nickel designated as Nickel.  A 3rd finish, Colt's Electroless Nickel (also designated on some Python boxes as Royal Coltguard ) was added later in production.  The Royal Coltguard electroless nickel finish was a satin nickel finish process intended to be a durable, more weather resistant finish compared to the others. This introduction was also partly a response to the fact that Colt at that time lacked a stainless steel version of the Python. Later the second material type (stainless steel) was added with the addition of  stainless steel models in the 1980s. The bright nickel model and the electroless nickel Royal Coltguard versions were eventually discontinued after the introduction of the satin stainless and mirror-polished Ultimate Stainless models. The stainless steel and Royal Blue finishes were offered until 2003 by Colt on the Python "Elite" model.

The six-inch model was the most popular generally, and the eight-inch model was intended for hunting. A three-inch barrel version is very collectible and much less common than the other barrel lengths.

The Python Hunter model, with eight-inch barrel and factory-installed 2X Leupold scope, was made in 1980. The Python Hunter was the first field-ready handgun hunting package made by a major handgun manufacturer. The scope was mounted on the barrel using Redfield mounts and the gun was packaged in a Haliburton case. The case also included a Colt-marked plastic ammunition box, a wood handle cleaning rod and other small items. It was discontinued by 1990 and briefly offered as a "Custom Shop" model afterward. A Python Target model was made for several years in .38 Special only, in blue and nickel finishes.  Another later cased version 8-inch Python similar to the Python Hunter was the Python Silhouette, supplied in a black  fitted case (not a Halliburton) with rib-mounted scope setup similar but not identical to the Hunter model.      

Two Colt revolver variants using Python barrels but not Python frames or internals were made in small numbers by Colt. The first was the Colt Boa of 1985, a limited production .357 Magnum revolver, made for the Lew Horton Distributing Company in Massachusetts. It uses a Python barrel mated to a Trooper Mk V frame. Six-hundred 6-inch revolvers and six-hundred 4-inch revolvers were made, of which one-hundred were matched sets. Though it resembles a Python visually, it is substantially different internally. The second was the stainless steel Colt Grizzly of 1994, another limited-production .357 Magnum revolver. It uses a Python barrel mated to a Colt King Cobra frame. Five hundred of these revolvers were manufactured, with six-inch Magna-ported barrels and smooth, unfluted cylinders. The ported barrel includes a bear footprint. Similar to the Grizzly was the Colt Kodiak, which was a Colt Anaconda with a Magna-ported barrel and an unfluted cylinder. Approximately 2000 Kodiaks were manufactured. All original Colt Pythons use the original Colt E/I frame type mechanics with a leaf hammer spring design in common with earlier Colt models, including the postwar Colt .357 Magnum model and the pre-war Colt Official Police and Army Special models.  As described above, the Boa and Grizzly are structurally part of the Mk.III/Mk.V revolver product lines which use the much later J and V designated frames.  While these various hybrids are very collectible due to low production quantities, because they are a completely different revolver action based upon the later coil-mainspring Colt products, they may not be considered Pythons.   

According to Colt historian, R. L. Wilson, Colt Pythons have been collected by Elvis Presley and various kings in the traditional sense: "H.M. (His Majesty) Hussein I of Jordan ordered a limited number of Pythons with 4-inch and 6-inch barrels, as gifts to his selected friends. Casing and barrel were embossed with His Majesty's crest. The Python for King Juan Carlos of Spain bore his name in flush gold on the sideplate. Among other celebrated recipients: King Khalid and Prince Fahd (Saudi Arabia), King Hassan (Morocco), Sheik Zayed (United Arab Emirates), President Anwar Sadat (Egypt) and President Hafez Assad (Syria)."

Usage

The Python immediately made inroads into the law enforcement market when introduced, with the 6-inch barrel being popular with uniformed officers and the 4-inch barrel considered optimal for plainclothes use. However, it has since fallen out of common use (along with all other revolvers) due to changing law enforcement needs that favor semi-automatic pistols. When law-enforcement agencies realized that the 9 mm semi-automatic pistols fire a round with similar characteristics to the .38 Special with higher capacity, they began a migration to these, and other, semi-automatic pistol cartridges. The move away from the Python is also being driven by the increasing number of law enforcement agencies which require officers to carry department-issue weapons (as a way to reduce liability).

The Colorado State Patrol issued 4-inch blue Pythons until their switch to the S&W .40 caliber autoloader. Georgia State Patrol and Florida Highway Patrol issued Pythons to their officers.

A Python, loaded with .357 Magnum semiwadcutter bullets, was used to murder Irish crime reporter Veronica Guerin in 1996, an act which resulted in the creation of the Criminal Assets Bureau.

Colt's Python revolvers are still popular on the used market and command high prices.

Criticisms

Official Colt historian R.L. Wilson described the Colt Python as "the Rolls-Royce of Colt revolvers", and firearms historian Ian V. Hogg referred to it as the "best revolver in the world". However, the revolver is not without its detractors. Some view a downside to the Colt Python's precision as a tendency to go "out of time" with continued heavy shooting. Mis-timing on a revolver is a condition in which the hand does not move each and every cylinder chamber to the exact correct rotation with respect to the forcing cone, so a shooter (or more likely someone nearby at right angles to the barrel) may notice some spray from burning propellant when the gun is fired, or—only in an extreme case—the gun may not fire when used as a double-action.  However some gas leakage escapes from the cylinder to barrel gap on most revolvers and this normal phenomenon should not be confused with an out-of-time action. Furthermore, any revolver used for many thousands of rounds may eventually require the same timing adjustments.  In any case the first and most common symptom of typical timing issues will be only a slight loss of accuracy, which on a Python may not even be noticeable to many shooters.

It is also useful to note that with the re-introduction of the new 21st-century Colt Python version, whenever examining criticisms of a Colt Python it is necessary to first determine whether the inquiry is in regards to an original Python model (1955 to c. 2003) or the new re-designed Python. This is for many reasons including the fact that a period approaching twenty years passed between the final high-volume manufacture of the last original Pythons and the redesign and introduction of the new Python. 

Author Martin Dougherty notes the weight of the Python as a drawback, as it is quite heavy for a handgun of its caliber, ranging from 2.4 lbs (1.1 kg) to 2.6 lbs (1.2 kg).  This makes the Python comparable to Smith & Wesson's premier .357, the M27, which weighs  with a  barrel. Both revolvers are  lighter than Smith and Wesson's more powerful M29 .44 Magnum, which weighs  in  barrel configuration.

See also
 Colt Diamondback
 Table of handgun and rifle cartridges

References

Further reading

External links

 The Colt Revolver in the American West—Python Model Revolver Pair
 The Colt Revolver in the American West—Cased Python Hunter Model Revolver
 Official Safety and Instruction Manual (.PDF)
 Colt Python Serial Numbers
 Ballistics by the Inch tests including the Colt Python

.357 Magnum firearms
Colt revolvers
Police weapons
Revolvers of the United States
Weapons and ammunition introduced in 1955